Vavdi may refer to the following places in Gujarat, western India :

 Vavdi Dharvala, a town and former Rajput princely state in Gohelwar, Kathiawar
 Vavdi Vachhani, a village in Sihor Taluka, Bhavnagar District, and former Rajput princely state in Gohelwar
 Vavdi Gajabhai, a village, also in Sihor Taluka
 Vavdi, another village, in Kheda Taluka, Kheda District
 Moti Vavdi, a village in Morbi Taluka, Morbi District
 Nani Vavdi, a village in Morbi Taluka, Morbi District